The Dubai Autodrome is an FIA sanctioned  motorsports circuit located in Dubailand, Dubai, United Arab Emirates. The architects of the project were Populous and the circuit was designed by Clive Bowen of Apex Circuit Design.

Opened in October 2004 with the final round of the LG Super Racing Weekend featuring the final rounds of the FIA GT Championship, European Touring Car Championship and 2004 Formula Renault V6 Eurocup season, Dubai Autodrome was the first part of the Dubai Motor City development that was available for use. The venue hosted the December 2005 A1 Grand Prix and the FIA GT Championship from 2004 to 2006. The track record at the longest configuration was set by Kamui Kobayashi (DAMS) with a time of 1:41.220 in a GP2 Asia car.

Since 2006 the Autodrome has been home to the Dubai 24 Hour, a GT, sports car and touring car automobile endurance race open to both professional and semi-professional teams. The circuit has FIA Grade 1 license, which means that it has all the requirements to host a Formula One race (though Abu Dhabi currently hosts F1 races in the UAE).

Events 

 Current
 January: 24H Series Hankook 24 Hours of Dubai, Formula Regional Middle East Championship, Formula 4 UAE Championship, Ferrari Challenge Asia-Pacific
 February: Asian Le Mans Series 4 Hours of Dubai, Formula Regional Middle East Championship, Porsche Sprint Challenge Middle East, Formula 4 UAE Championship, UAE Procar Championship, Gulf Radical Cup
 March: UAE Procar Championship, Gulf Radical Cup
 December: Gulf Historic Dubai Grand Prix Revival

 Former
 A1 Grand Prix (2005)
 European Touring Car Championship (2004)
 FIA GT Championship (2004–2006)
 Formula Regional Asian Championship (2020–2022)
 Formula Renault V6 Eurocup (2004)
 GP2 Asia Series (2008)
 MRF Challenge Formula 2000 Championship (2015–2019)
 Speedcar Series (2008–2009)
 TCR International Series (2017)
 TCR Middle East Series (2017–2019)

Dubai Kartdrome
The Kartdrome an international standard karting track situated across the boulevard from the Dubai Autodrome main straight.

The venue also hosts UAE championship karting and has in the past hosted rounds of the Biland World Finals and the Middle East Karting Championship. The biggest karting race in the Middle East (Dubai O Plate) is held there.

Track configurations
The circuit has four racing configurations and two additional non-racing sections. These are the courses with access to the pit area.

Handling courses

Lap records
The official lap record for the current circuit layout is 1:41.220, set by Kamui Kobayashi during the 2008 2nd Dubai GP2 Asia Series round, while the unofficial all-time track record is 1:40.887, set by Romain Grosjean in the qualifying of the aforementioned race. The official fastest race lap records at the Dubai Autodrome are listed as:

Fatal accidents

Notes

References

External links 
 
 Dubai 24 Hour Official site

A1 Grand Prix circuits
Sports venues in Dubai
Dubailand
Motorsport venues in the United Arab Emirates
Sports venues completed in 2004